Robert Monteith (1812 – 31 March 1884), DL, JP, was a Scottish politician and philanthropist, Deputy Lieutenant for the County of Lanark.

Family

Robert Monteith was born in Glasgow, the only son of Henry Monteith (d. 1848), twice Lord Provost of Glasgow and MP for Lanark Burghs, and his first wife, Christian Cameron.

He was educated at Glasgow University and Trinity College, Cambridge, where he was a member of the Cambridge Apostles. He converted to the Roman Catholic Church in 1846 and was a prominent Christian socialist.

He married Wilhelmina Anne Mellish daughter of Joseph Mellish of Blythe, Nottinghamshire. They lived at Carstairs House.

Their son was:
Joseph Monteith

Their daughter was:
Mary Frances Monteith, she married Francis Ernest Kerr, son of Reverend Lord Henry Francis Charles Kerr, younger son of William Kerr, 6th Marquess of Lothian, and Louisa Dorothea Hope, daughter of General The Hon Sir Alexander Hope (British Army officer)

He died at Carstairs House on 31 March 1884.

Career

He was appointed Deputy Lieutenant for the County of Lanarkshire on 27 October 1855.

On 9 February 1870 he accompanied David Urquhart to a private audience with Pope Pius IX.

References

1812 births
1884 deaths
Deputy Lieutenants of Lanarkshire
Scottish Roman Catholics
Alumni of Trinity College, Cambridge
Converts to Roman Catholicism from Anglicanism